Embramine (a.k.a. Mebryl, Bromadryl) is an antihistamine and anticholinergic.

References 

Diphenhydramines
H1 receptor antagonists
Organobromides